The Auburn–Tennessee football rivalry is an American college football rivalry between the Auburn Tigers and Tennessee Volunteers. The game was traditionally played prior to the 1992 football season, when the Southeastern Conference split into its Eastern and Western divisions. Auburn leads the series 29–22–3.

Series history
The series started in 1900 with a 23–0 Auburn victory in Birmingham, Alabama, and was played traditionally from 1956–91. When the SEC split into two divisions in 1992, Auburn was placed to west division and Tennessee was placed to the east division, and the rivalry was no longer played annually with both schools only meeting every five to seven years. Every east and west teams had two permeant cross division opponent's. Auburn opponent's were Florida and Georgia, and Tennessee's were Alabama and Arkansas. Although, Florida was dropped from Auburn's schedule ending that annual rivalry, and Arkansas was removed from Tennessee's leaving only one permeant cross division opponent. From their current divisions, Tennessee started a rivalry with Georgia, while Auburn began an important rivalry with LSU. Auburn is 7–3 vs Tennessee since the SEC expanded, and both teams met in the 1997, and 2004 SEC Championship Game. Auburn owns the longest win streak in series history at six from 2003–13.

The Auburn–Tennessee game has been played in four locations. They have played in Birmingham, Alabama at Legion Field, Knoxville, Tennessee at Neyland Stadium, Auburn, Alabama at Jordan–Hare Stadium and Atlanta, Georgia at the Georgia Dome. Auburn leads 10–5 in Birmingham, Tennessee leads 13–10–2 in Knoxville, Auburn leads 8–3–1 in Auburn and the teams are tied 1–1 in Atlanta.

On July 30, 2021, Texas and Oklahoma accepted to join the Southeastern Conference effective July 1, 2025, which could potentially lead to both teams meeting annually again.

Notable games

 1970: Auburn overcame a 10–0 deficit and defeated the #17 Vols by a score of 36–23 in Birmingham. It was the only loss of the year for Tennessee and cost the Vols the SEC Championship.
 1972: Unranked Auburn upset No. 4 Tennessee in Birmingham. Auburn led most of the game 10–0. Tennessee came back to cut the lead 10–6, but Auburn held on for the upset. 
 1985: In a game nationally televised by ABC, the Tigers came to Neyland Stadium ranked #1 with Heisman Trophy candidate Bo Jackson.  However, Tennessee quarterback Tony Robinson made a case to be considered for the Heisman himself by passing for 259 yards and four touchdowns in a 38–20 blowout.
 1990: Proving once again that big leads do not hold up in the Auburn–Tennessee series, Auburn spotted Tennessee a 26–9 fourth-quarter lead, only to storm back to tie it at 26–26. Auburn QB Stan White threw a pair of fourth-quarter touchdown passes, both on fourth down. Tennessee missed a potential game-winning field goal with 15 seconds left.
1991: The last annual meeting between both teams due to the expansion of the SEC. At that time, Neyland Statium set a record of attendance were the #5 Tennessee defeated #13 Auburn, 30–21.
 1997 SEC Championship Game: In the 1997 SEC Championship Game in Atlanta, Auburn scored 20 unanswered points to take a 20–7 lead. Tennessee scored two touchdowns late in the third quarter and another early in the fourth to win, 30–29. Tennessee's quarterback Peyton Manning threw for 373 yards and four touchdowns, while Auburn signal caller Dameyune Craig passed for 262 yards and a pair of scores. Tennessee went on and lost to Nebraska in  the Orange Bowl, 42–17.
 2003: Tennessee came into Jordan–Hare Stadium ranked No. 7. Auburn took their opening drive 80 yards and scored on a 6-yard run by Ronnie Brown. On their next possession, Jason Campbell threw a 29-yard touchdown pass in the left corner of the end zone to Ben Obomanu. The Auburn defense held Tennessee in check for most of the first half, but the Vols drove 85 yards to cut the lead to 14–7 at halftime. Cadillac Williams scored on a 1-yard run on Auburn’s first possession of the second half to give the Tigers a 21–7 lead. Jason Campbell then completed an 8-yard touchdown pass to Cole Bennett on the second play of the fourth quarter to put Auburn up 28–7. Clausen threw for a touchdown on each of the Vols’ next two possessions bringing the score to 28–21 with just over seven minutes left in the game. The Vols drove to the Auburn 30-yard line late in the game but Carlos Rogers intercepted a pass to end the threat. Auburn won 28–21 to beat Tennessee for the first time since 1988.
 2004 SEC Championship Game: After Auburn blew out the Vols in the regular season the two teams won their divisions and played again in SEC Championship game. Auburn won the SEC Championship with a 38–28 victory then went on to defeat Virginia Tech in the Sugar Bowl.

Game results

Sources: 2011 Auburn Football Media Guide  2011 Tennessee Football Media Guide  and College Football Data Warehouse.

See also  
 List of NCAA college football rivalry games

References

College football rivalries in the United States
Auburn Tigers football
Tennessee Volunteers football